The 5th West Virginia Infantry Regiment was an infantry regiment that served in the Union Army during the American Civil War.

Service
The 5th West Virginia Infantry Regiment was organized at Ceredo, West Virginia, beginning on September 3, 1861, and mustered in on October 18, 1861. Originally mustered into service as the 5th Virginia Regiment of the Union Army, it became the 5th West Virginia when West Virginia was designated a distinct state. Organized in southwestern West Virginia, the majority of men were recruited from southern Ohio and eastern Kentucky, with many others from Wayne County, West Virginia. Lawrence County, Ohio, alone provided 419 men to the regiment. Served Unattached, District of the Kanawha, West Virginia, to March, 1862. District of Cumberland, Md., Mountain Department, to April, 1862. Milroy's Independent Brigade, Mountain Department, to June, 1862. Milroy's Independent Brigade, 1st Army Corps, Army of Virginia, to September, 1862. Under Milroy, the 5th Virginia (later to be designated the 5th West Virginia) fought at the Battle of McDowell, May 8, 1862 and the Battle of Cross Keys on June 8, 1862, with the regiment under the command of Col John L. Ziegler. Defenses of Washington, D.C., to October, 1862. District of the Kanawha, West Virginia, Dept. Ohio, to January, 1863. Unattached, District of the Kanawha, West Virginia, to March, 1863. 1st Brigade, 3rd Division, 8th Army Corps, Middle Department, to June, 1863. 1st Brigade, Scammon's Division, Dept. of West Virginia, to December, 1863. 1st Brigade, 3rd Division, West Virginia, to April, 1864. 1st Brigade, 2nd Infantry Division, West Virginia, to November, 1864.

Detailed Service
Duty at Ceredo and in the Kanawha Valley, W. Va., to December 10, 1861. Moved to Parkersburg, W. Va., December 10, thence to New Creek, W. Va., February, 1862. Linn Creek, Logan County, February 8. Duty at New Creek until May. Joined Milroy's Brigade May 2. Battle of McDowell May 8. Near Franklin May 10–12 and May 26. Battle of Cross Keys June 8. At Strasburg June 20-July 5. Advance to Luray July 5–11. Moved to Sperryville July 11, thence to Woodville July 22, and duty there until August 9. Battle of Cedar Mountain August 9. Cedar Run August 10 Pope's Campaign in Northern Virginia August 16-September 2. Fords of the Rappahannock August 20–23. Freeman's Ford, Hazel River, August 22. Johnson's Ford August 22. Waterloo Bridge August 24–25. Gainesville August 28. Groveton August 29. During the Second Battle of Bull Run on August 30, the regiment was sent by Gen. Milroy to link up with an Ohio infantry regiment to try to provide support for other units attempting to hold Gen. Stonewall Jackson's line at the unfinished railroad tracks just down from Henry Hill. The units became lost and ended up right in the middle of Jackson's line. After a short skirmish, the 5th West Virginia pulled back to regroup. Eventually they were directed to try to support the Union troops trying to hold Henry Hill, with Gen. Milroy waving his saber in a desperate attempt to stop the tide of soldiers escaping the tremendous onslaught reigning down on them from the Confederates. Duty in the Defenses of Washington, D.C., until September 29. Moved to Beverly, W. Va., September 29-October 9. Parkersburg October 10. Duty at Ceredo until March, 1863. Scouting Little Kanawha and east side of Big Sandy Rivers. Ordered to Wayne Court House March. Hurricane Creek March 28. At Charlestown, Barboursville, Hurricane Bridge and other points in the Kanawha Valley until April, 1864. Scammon's demonstration from the Kanawha Valley December 8–25, 1863. Crook's Raid on the Virginia & Tennessee Railroad May 2–19, 1864. Rocky Gap May 6. Battle of Cloyd's Mountain May 9. New River Bridge May 10. Blacksburg May 10. Union May 12. Meadow Bluff May 24. Hunter's Expedition to Lynchburg May 26-July 1. Lexington June 11–12. Buchanan June 14. Otter Creek June 16. Diamond Hill June 17. Lynchburg June 17–18. Buford's Gap June 19. Salem June 21. Moved to the Shenandoah Valley July 13–15. Kablestown July 19. Battle of Kernstown, Winchester, July 23–24 Martinsburg July 25. Sheridan's Shenandoah Valley Campaign August 6-November 1. Strasburg August 15. Summit Point August 24. Halltown August 2. Berryville September 3. Battle of Opequan, Winchester, September 19. Fisher's Hill September 22. Battle of Cedar Creek October 19. Veterans of the regiment were consolidated with 9th West Virginia Infantry November 9, 1864, to form the 1st West Virginia Veteran Volunteer Infantry Regiment.

Casualties
The 5th West Virginia Volunteer Infantry Regiment suffered 4 officers and 57 enlisted men killed or mortally wounded in battle and 2 officers and 88 enlisted men dead from disease for a total of 151 fatalities.

Commanders
 Colonel John L. Zeigler (resigned April 14, 1863)
 Colonel Abais Allen Tomlinson

References

The Civil War Archive

See also
West Virginia Units in the Civil War
West Virginia in the Civil War

Units and formations of the Union Army from West Virginia
1862 establishments in Virginia
Military units and formations established in 1862
Military units and formations established in 1861
Military units and formations disestablished in 1864